The Santa Barbara Unified School District is the main public school district that serves Santa Barbara and Goleta, California. On January 12, 2011, the board of education unanimously approved a resolution to reorganize the Santa Barbara Elementary and Secondary School Districts into a single unified school district. The changeover began July 1, 2011.

Because the state provides a fiscal incentive for school district that unify, unification will result in $6 million of ongoing revenue the Santa Barbara Unified School District.

History
First attempts at creating public schools began in Santa Barbara after the founding of the Presidio in the 1790s, with mixed success. But as Robert Christian wrote in his thesis on the history of the district, "...on June 6, 1866, the Santa Barbara School District was formed. The schools were no longer administered by the County Superintendent, but in complete control of the electorate of the city. In 1866, Alpheus B. Thompson, County Superintendent reported that there were three school districts in the County: San Buenaventura, Montecito, and Santa Barbara. The census showed that there were 1,243 children between the ages of five and fifteen residing in the County, with only 325 pupils enrolled in schools, plus forty-one enrolled in private schools. Each district had two schools, with the length of the school year varying from three to five months. The teachers’ salaries varied from $30 to $50 per month, with the Santa Barbara district paying a total of $1,165.25."

Schools

Elementary schools 
Adams Elementary School
Adelante Charter School
Cleveland Elementary School
Franklin Elementary School
Harding University Partnership School
McKinley Elementary School
Monroe Elementary School
Peabody Charter School
Roosevelt Elementary School
Santa Barbara Charter School
Santa Barbara Community Academy
Washington Elementary School

Junior high schools 
Goleta Valley Junior High School
La Colina Junior High School
La Cumbre Junior High School
Santa Barbara Junior High School

High schools 
Alta Vista Alternative High School 
Dos Pueblos High School
La Cuesta Continuation High School 
San Marcos High School
Santa Barbara High School

References

External links
 
 Marjorie Luke Theatre Website

School districts in Santa Barbara County, California
Goleta, California
Santa Barbara, California
1866 establishments in California